The Centrifuge Accommodations Module (CAM) is a cancelled element of the International Space Station. Although the module was planned to contain several parts, the  centrifuge still was considered the most important capability of the module.

History
The centrifuge would have provided controlled acceleration rates (artificial gravity) for experiments and the capability to:
Simultaneously provide two different artificial gravity levels.
Provide partial g and hyper g environment for specimens to investigate altered gravity effects and g-thresholds.
Provide short duration and partial g and hyper g environment for specimens to investigate temporal effects of gravity exposure.
Provide Earth simulation environment on ISS to isolate microgravity effects on specimens.
Provide Earth simulation environment on ISS to allow specimens to recover from microgravity effects.
Provide in situ 1g controls for specimens in micro-gravity.

It was built by JAXA's predecessor, NASDA, but owned by NASA, who obtained ownership of the CAM by trading in a free launch of the Japanese Experiment Module Kibo to the Station. The CAM flight model along with the engineering model of the centrifuge rotor were manufactured.  The CAM would have been attached to the zenith port on the Harmony module of the ISS. It was cancelled in 2005 alongside the Habitation Module and the Crew Return Vehicle, because of ISS cost overruns and scheduling problems in Shuttle assembly flights.

It is now on display in an outdoor exhibit at the Tsukuba Space Center in Japan.

See also
Artificial gravity
Space adaptation syndrome
Space colonization
Nautilus-X#ISS centrifuge demonstration

References

External
Centrifuge, Japan Aerospace Exploration Agency (JAXA)

Centrifuges
Cancelled spacecraft
Components of the International Space Station